German election, 1949 may refer to

West German federal election, 1949, or 
East German Constitutional Assembly election, 1949